Rodrigo Antonio Brandão (12 April 1897 – 6 March 1959), known as Rodrigo, was a Brazilian footballer. He played in one match for the Brazil national football team in 1920. He was also part of Brazil's squad for the 1920 South American Championship.

References

External links
 

1897 births
1959 deaths
Brazilian footballers
Brazil international footballers
Place of birth missing
Association footballers not categorized by position